William Walmsley (18 November 1924 – 3 September 2001) was a Scottish footballer who played for Rangers, Dumbarton and Stenhousemuir.

References

1924 births
2001 deaths
Scottish footballers
Dumbarton F.C. players
Rangers F.C. players
Stenhousemuir F.C. players
Scottish Football League players
Association football outside forwards